The 2012 Miami Dolphins season was the franchise's 43rd season in the National Football League (NFL), and the 47th overall in the American Football Conference Eastern Division (AFC East). The season concluded with the Dolphins finishing second in the AFC Eastern Division with a 7–9 record, and no postseason play for the fourth consecutive season.

The Dolphins entered the season under new head coach Joe Philbin, with hopes of revitalizing the franchise from three consecutive losing seasons under head coach Tony Sparano. The team started with drafting quarterback Ryan Tannehill in the first round of the NFL draft, to compete for the starting job against incumbent Matt Moore and free agent David Garrard. Tannehill was eventually named the team's regular season starter heading in the second preseason game against the Carolina Panthers. The team finished the preseason with an 0–4 record for the third time in franchise history.

The Dolphins opened the regular season with a disappointing 10–30 loss against the Houston Texans, but a week later ended up with an impressive 35–13 win over the Oakland Raiders. Following the win, the Dolphins lost two close overtime games against the Arizona Cardinals and division rival New York Jets. However, Miami was able to come back and win three consecutive games including a blow out rematch with the New York Jets, but after close critical loses to the Indianapolis Colts, division rival Buffalo Bills and New England Patriots, the Dolphins were unable to achieve a winning season.

Ryan Tannehill became the first rookie quarterback in Dolphins history to complete a full season as the team's starting quarterback. During the week four game against the Arizona Cardinals, Tannehill broke former Dolphins quarterback Dan Marino's single-game rookie passing record with 431 passing yards and came one yard short of breaking Cam Newton's NFL rookie single-game passing record. In the same game wide receiver Brian Hartline broke the Dolphins single-game receiving record with 12 receptions for 253 yards.

Personnel changes
Despite getting an extension through 2013 in the early 2011 off-season, head coach Tony Sparano was fired by the team after 13 disappointing games into the 2011 season with a 4–9 record. In Sparano's first year 2008, he orchestrated the second greatest record turnaround in NFL history with an 11–5 record from a 1–15 record between the 2007–2008 NFL seasons, and finished second behind Atlanta Falcons' head coach Mike Smith in voting for the 2008 AP NFL Coach of the Year. However, Sparano failed to capitalize, posting mediocre records in his final three seasons as head coach. Following Sparano's firing, assistant head coach Todd Bowles reigned control of the team for the final three games, and entered the off-season as the lead candidate for the 2012 Miami Dolphins' head coaching position.

Former Tennessee Titans' head coach Jeff Fisher entered talks as becoming the next Dolphins' head coach, and the Dolphins organization openly pursued him as a top candidate. Other coaches drawing interest were Green Bay Packers' offensive coordinator Joe Philbin, Cincinnati Bengals' defensive coordinator Mike Zimmer, Chicago Bears' special teams coordinator Dave Toub, and Denver Broncos' offensive coordinator Mike McCoy. Ultimately on January 13, 2012, Fisher decided to pursue the vacant St. Louis Rams' head coaching position, and subsequently on January 20, 2012, the Dolphins hired former Green Bay Packers' offensive coordinator Joe Philbin as the franchise's tenth head coach.

On January 27, 2012, the new coaching regime came into shape with the signing of Philbin's longtime friends: former Texas A&M head coach Mike Sherman and Cincinnati Bengals defensive back coach Kevin Coyle, as offensive and defensive coordinators, respectively.

Sherman, who was fired by Texas A&M earlier this year after posted a 25–25 record in his four seasons, gave Philbin his first NFL job when he served as head coach for the Green Bay Packers. At the time of signing with the Dolphins, Sherman was also a finalist for the vacant head coaching job for the Tampa Bay Buccaneers. Coyle had spent the last 11 seasons as a part of the Bengals organization. Both had served as coaches together at the College of the Holy Cross between 1985 and 1988.

The rest of Philbin's coaching regime includes the acquisition of linebackers coach George Edwards, and assistant quarterbacks coach Zac Taylor on January 30, 2012.  Acquirement of offensive line coach Jim Turner on February 1, 2012, assistant defensive line backs coach Blue Adams, defensive assistant Charlie Bullen, offensive assistant Ben Johnson and Chris Mosley as offensive assistant line coach on February 10, 2012. Philbin also retained the contracts of tight ends coach Dan Campbell, strength coach Darren Krein, special teams coordinator Darren Rizzi, and Jeff Nixon as running backs coach from coach Sparano's tenure.

Roster changes
After an unpromising 13–18 record as a starter, the Miami Dolphins decided not to renew the contract of quarterback Chad Henne. In early March, Henne became an unrestricted free agent, along with defensive end Kendall Langford. Shortly after, on March 14, 2012, Henne signed a two-year contract with the Jacksonville Jaguars and on March 17, 2012, Langford signed a four-year deal with the St. Louis Rams.

The Dolphins' first major transaction of the off-season was the trade of 2011 Pro Bowl wide receiver Brandon Marshall. After being acquired in a trade two years prior from the Denver Broncos, Marshall was traded to the Chicago Bears on March 13, 2012. The trade further opened up speculation that the Dolphins were trying to gain more cap space to sign free agent wide receiver Reggie Wayne, to lure former teammate and free agent quarterback Peyton Manning to Miami. The Dolphins were one of the teams who've considered signing the long-time Colts quarterback, along with the Tennessee Titans, Arizona Cardinals, and Seattle Seahawks. Manning ultimately signed with the Denver Broncos where he spent the rest of his career. However, speculation was quickly suppressed when Wayne re-signed with the Indianapolis Colts, leaving the Dolphins without a number one wide receiver entering the draft.

On March 14, 2012, the Dolphins re-signed defensive tackle Paul Soliai, to a two-year deal worth $12 million. They also extended the contract of linebacker Cameron Wake through the 2016 season on May 5, 2012. The contract was worth $49 million over five years, with a guaranteed $20 million. During the season, the Dolphins extended the contract of punter Brandon Fields, to four years worth $13 million, on August 4, 2012.

To compete against incumbent starting quarterback Matt Moore, the Dolphins signed quarterback David Garrard on March 19, 2012. However, after suffering a knee injury during training camp, Garrard was released on September 4, 2012.

The Dolphins also released veteran and team captain strong safety Yeremiah Bell on March 19, 2012. The transaction saved the Dolphins $4.3 million in cap space, and allowed two-year safety Reshad Jones to move to the position. Bell eventually signed a one-year deal with the division-rival New York Jets on May 18, 2012.

To fill the vacancy left by Brandon Marshall, the Dolphins signed veteran receiver Chad Johnson (whose last name was Ochocinco at the time of the signing) on June 11, 2012. During training camp, Johnson's work ethic, which was highlighted on HBO's Hard Knocks, put him on track to make the opening day roster; however, a domestic dispute between Johnson and his wife Evelyn Lozada prompted the Dolphins to release him on August 12, 2012.

After struggling to adapt to new defensive coordinator Kevin Coyle's system, the Dolphins traded former first-round pick and cornerback Vontae Davis on August 24, 2012. In return, the Dolphins received a second-round and conditional late-round 2013 NFL Draft pick .

2012 draft class

The 2012 National Football League Draft was held April 26–28 in the Radio City Music Hall in New York City, New York. Entering the draft, the Miami Dolphins major positions to fill were quarterback and wide receiver. The Dolphins needed a long-term quarterback to take over for incumbent starter Matt Moore at the end of the season, after negotiations failed with top free agent quarterbacks Peyton Manning and Matt Flynn. Many analysts, including ESPN's Adam Schefter, believed the Dolphins would draft Texas A&M quarterback Ryan Tannehill with the 8th overall pick, if the Cleveland Browns, who held the 4th overall pick, didn't first. Also, many debated that Tannehill, who was once a wide receiver recently turned quarterback, was not deserving of a top 10 pick.

Ultimately, with the 8th overall pick of the first round, the Dolphins selected Tannehill. The selection marked the fourth time that the Dolphins had selected a quarterback in the first round of a draft since Dan Marino in 1983, Bob Griese in 1967, and Rick Norton in 1966. With their second pick, the Dolphins selected offensive tackle Jonathan Martin from Stanford.

Notes
 The team acquired an additional third-round selection (#73 overall) as part of a trade that sent wide receiver Brandon Marshall to the Chicago Bears. The team then swapped third-round selections (#73 and #78) with the San Diego Chargers and received an extra sixth-round pick (#183).
 The team swapped sixth-round selections with the New Orleans Saints (the Dolphins originally held the #179 selection) as part of a trade in which the team acquired running back Reggie Bush from the Saints. The 196th pick was then used in order for Miami to trade up in the fourth round to select Lamar Miller (from #103 to #97).
 The team swapped fifth-round selections with the Tennessee Titans (the Dolphins originally held the #145 selection) and received an extra seventh-round selection (#227).

Schedule

Preseason

Regular season

Note: Intra-division opponents are in bold text.

Game summaries

Week 1: at Houston Texans

Source: 
    
    
    
    
    
    
    
    

The Dolphins entered their first game of the season with a 0–0 record, traveling to face the 0–0 Houston Texans. The game was the first start for rookie quarterback Ryan Tannehill and head coach Joe Philbin. Tannehill became the first Dolphins rookie quarterback to start the first game of the season. Entering the game the Texans are the only team the Dolphins have not beaten, holding a 0–6 record all-time against the team.

Both teams moved the ball well on their opening drives, but failed to score. The Dolphins received the ball on their own 42-yard line after a missed field goal by Houston kicker Shayne Graham. After a Reggie Bush recovered fumble on 3rd down on the Houston 14-yard line the Dolphins kicker Dan Carpenter attempted and successfully executed a 39-yard field goal with (3:19) left in the first quarter.

Both defenses held steady, keeping both offenses out of the redzone heading to the mid-way point of the second quarter. However, at the (7:35) point, quarterback Tannehill was intercepted by Johnathan Joseph at the 50-yard line for 36 yards. Within the shadow of their own goal posts the Dolphins held the Texans to a Shayne Graham 35-yard field goal. The interception by Tannehill was the first of his career, and marked a downhill spiral for the rest of the game.

Following the score the Dolphins moved quickly to the Houston side of the field after a 10-yard rush by Reggie Bush and 32-yard pass to running back Daniel Thomas. But after a few incomplete passes, Tannehill had his pass intended for receiver Legadu Naanee deflected by a defensive lineman and intercepted by linebacker Brian Cushing with (4:06) left in the second quarter. The Texans quickly turned the turnover into points, with an Arian Foster 14-yard rush.

On the first play following the Houston kickoff quarterback Tannehill again had his pass deflected by a defensive lineman, but instead was intercepted by Kareem Jackson. After a defensive pass interference penalty, running back Arian Foster rushed for his second rushing touchdown of the game at the (0:49) mark. Again following the kickoff the Dolphins again turned the ball over following a Daniel Thomas fumble. The turnover was shortly followed by a 14-yard pass touchdown from Houston quarterback Matt Schaub to receiver Andre Johnson at the (0:12) mark.

Following a quick three and out by the Texans following halftime, punt returner Marcus Thigpen returned a punt for 72 yards for a touchdown. But for the remainder of the game the Dolphins offense failed to produce any scores, but held the Texans defense to two Shayne Graham field goals: 40 and 19 yards, respectively.

Week 2: vs. Oakland Raiders

Source: 
    
    
    
    
    
    
    
    

The Dolphins entered their second game of the season with a 0–1 record, hosting the 0–1 Oakland Raiders. The game marked the third consecutive season game between the two teams and 36th all-time, with the Dolphins winning the last two games with an average margin of victory of 18 points.

Miami opened the game with an impressive 80-yard drive after the opening kickoff, which lead to a quarterback Ryan Tannehill two-yard rushing touchdown. Two possessions later at the (3:28) mark in the first quarter, Oakland quarterback Carson Palmer threw a 64-yard touchdown to Mike Goodson tying the game.

Through a majority of the second quarter both teams had a hard time moving across the 50-yard line, which was matched with impressive punting by both Dolphins punter Brandon Fields and Oakland punter Shane Lechler. By the end of the game Field punted the ball six times for 319 yards with an average yard per punt of 53.2 and Lechler punted the ball nine times for 422 yards with an average yard per punt of 46.9. However, Oakland managed to get the ball back with (3:33) left in the quarter and orchestrated a drive that ended with a Sebastian Janikowski 25-yard field goal. Both teams entered halftime evenly matched.

It didn't take long following halftime for the Dolphins rushing attack to shine. On the second possession of the half the Dolphins drove the ball down field and allowed Reggie Bush to rush for a 25-yard touchdown. On the next Miami possession, after a quick pass from Tannehill to receiver Brian Hartline, Reggie Bush rushed 65 yards for another Miami touchdown. A few possessions later Oakland answered with a Janikowski 27-yard field goal.

With little opposition from the Oakland defense Miami's offense kept the ball moving and managed to score on their next two possessions. Once with an Anthony Fasano 14-yard reception touchdown from Tannehill, the first of his career, and again with a Lamar Miller 15-yard rushing touchdown, the first of his career. Oakland tried to stop the bleeding on their next drive, but quarterback Palmer was intercepted by safety Reshad Jones.

The impressive game of 172 rushing yards on 26 attempts by running back Reggie Bush earned him the week 2 AFC Offensive Player of the Week and FedEx Air and Ground rusher of the week honors.

Week 3: vs. New York Jets

With the loss, the Dolphins fell to 1–2.

Week 4: at Arizona Cardinals

The Dolphins were seeking their first win in Phoenix since 1996. With the loss, the Dolphins fell to 1–3.

Week 5: at Cincinnati Bengals

With the win, the Dolphins improved to 2–3.

Week 6: vs. St. Louis Rams

With the win, the Dolphins head into their bye week at 3–3.

Week 8: at New York Jets

With the win, the Dolphins improved to 4–3.

Week 9: at Indianapolis Colts

With the loss, the Dolphins fell to 4–4.

Week 10: vs. Tennessee Titans

With the loss, the Dolphins fell to 4–5.

Week 11: at Buffalo Bills

Week 12: vs. Seattle Seahawks

Week 13: vs. New England Patriots

Week 14: at San Francisco 49ers

Week 15: vs. Jacksonville Jaguars

Week 16: vs. Buffalo Bills
 With the win, the Dolphins improved to 7–8, but were officially eliminated from playoff contention, due to the Bengals' 13–10 win over the Steelers.

Week 17: at New England Patriots

Standings

Conference standings

Staff

Roster

Statistics

Team leaders

 final stat values through 16 weeks

League rankings
Total Offense (YPG): 311.5 (27th) 
Points (PPG): 18.0 (27th)
Passing (YPG): 198.9 (26th) 
Rushing (YPG): 112.6 (17th)
Total Defense (YPG): 356.8 (21st)  
Points (PPG) : 19.8 (7th)
Passing (YPG): 248.4 (27th)  
Rushing (YPG): 108.4 (13th)

 final stat values through 17 weeks

Notes
: On January 20, 2013 Richie Incognito replaced Baltimore Ravens' guard Marshal Yanda, who played in Super Bowl XLVII instead.
: On January 21, 2013 Randy Starks replaced an injured New England Patriots' defensive tackle Vince Wilfork.
: Because Vontae Davis did not meet a conditional amount of playing time throughout the season with the Indianapolis Colts, the late round draft pick was forfeited.

References

External links
 
 Miami Dolphins & NFL at the Miami Herald

Miami
Miami Dolphins seasons
Miami Dolphins